Punish Yourself is a French industrial metal band best known for their stage theatrics and innovative style of industrial/punk music. They describe their style as "Fluo Cyber Punk".

Current members
 VX 69 (sometimes "vx" or "vx Cheerleader 69") (born Vincent Villalon) : Vocals (also plays in band "Le Cabaret De L'Impasse", "Cheerleader 69", "Pinball Lizard & The Acid Kings")
 Miss Z (born Sandrine Caracci) : Guitar, Vocals
 P.RLOX (born Pierre-Laurent Clément) : Guitar
 X.av (born Xavier Guionie) : Drums (also plays in bands "Le Cabaret De L'Impasse", "Cheerleader 69")
 Klodia : 
 Fafa/MCC (born Jean-François Clément) : Dance, Pyrotechnics

Past members
 Holivier Menini : Guitar
 Georges Garza : Drums
 Magali Arino : Vocals
 Séverine Naudi : Keyboards
 Frankie Lacosta : Bass
 PFX68 : Bass
 Stéphane Vanstaen : Percussions
 Gilles Alogues : Keyboards
 Bud Silva : Drums
 Olga, Dollga : Dance

Discography
Studio albums
 1998: Feuer Tanz System
 2001: Disco Flesh: Warp 99
 2004: Sexplosive Locomotive
 2007: Cult Movie (CD/DVD)
 2008: Gore Baby Gore
 2009: Pink Panther Party
 2010: Punish Yourself VS Sonic Area : Phenomedia
 2013: Holiday in Guadalajara
 2017: Spin the pig

Live albums
 2003: Behind The City Lights

Compilation
 2005: Crypt 1996-2002

Demos
 1994: First Demo Tape
 1995: Second Demo Tape

Note
In 2004, pornographic actress Coralie Trinh Thi wrote a comic about them called Deep Inside Punish Yourself. In the same year, PY composed the song Holy Trinh Thi in reference to her.

TV apparitions
 Tracks on Arte Channel, a documentary about new punk bands
 On Ne Peut Pas Plaire À Tout Le Monde on France 2, a talk-show/reportage about satanism in the rock and metal music.

References 

French industrial music groups
French industrial metal musical groups
Organizations based in Toulouse
Musical groups from Occitania (administrative region)